Lewis O'Brien may refer to:

Lewis O'Brien (footballer) (born 1998), English footballer for Nottingham Forest
Lewis O'Brien (Kaurna elder) (born 1930), Aboriginal Elder of the Kaurna people
Lewis O'Brien (politician) (1868–1955), Canadian politician and doctor